Schechs Mill is an unincorporated community in Caledonia Township, Houston County, Minnesota, United States.

Notes

Unincorporated communities in Houston County, Minnesota
Unincorporated communities in Minnesota